The Farmers and Merchants Bank-Masonic Lodge a is historic commercial and fraternal building at 288 North Broadway in Booneville, Arkansas.  It is a two-story structure, with Colonial Revival and Early Commercial architecture.  It was listed on the National Register of Historic Places in 1993.

It originally hosted a bank on its first floor and a Masonic meeting hall on its second floor.  The building's cornerstone indicates the Masonic association, but not the bank's.  The local Masonic lodge met there from 1906 to 1985.

See also
National Register of Historic Places listings in Logan County, Arkansas

References

Bank buildings on the National Register of Historic Places in Arkansas
Colonial Revival architecture in Arkansas
Buildings and structures in Booneville, Arkansas
Clubhouses on the National Register of Historic Places in Arkansas
Buildings designated early commercial in the National Register of Historic Places
Former Masonic buildings in Arkansas
Commercial buildings in Arkansas
National Register of Historic Places in Logan County, Arkansas
Historic district contributing properties in Arkansas